Associazione Sportiva Roma had a successful season, in which Sven-Göran Eriksson's typical Scandinavian tactical approach was able to improve Roma's fortunes to a level where they once again fought for the league title. They also won the Coppa Italia, but the chance of a double disappeared in a 3–2 loss at home to bottom side Lecce, which all but secured Juventus's title. The most important part in Roma's revival was an efficient midfield with several top-class players in addition to striker Roberto Pruzzo, with several playmakers providing multiple assists to league topscorer Pruzzo.

Squad

Goalkeepers
  Franco Tancredi
  Attilio Gregori

Defenders
  Dario Bonetti
  Manuel Gerolin
  Settimio Lucci
  Sebastiano Nela
  Emidio Oddi
  Ubaldo Righetti

Midfielders
  Carlo Ancelotti
  Zbigniew Boniek
  Toninho Cerezo
  Bruno Conti
  Stefano Desideri
  Antonio Di Carlo
  Giuseppe Giannini
  Stefano Impallomeni

Attackers
  Roberto Pruzzo
  Francesco Graziani
  Sandro Tovalieri

Competitions

Serie A

League table

Matches

Coppa Italia

Group stage

Results

Round of 16

Quarter-finals

Semi-final

Final

Topscorers
  Roberto Pruzzo 19 (4)
  Zbigniew Boniek 7 (1)
  Francesco Graziani 5
  Toninho Cerezo 4
  Sandro Tovalieri 3

References

A.S. Roma seasons
Roma